Polycarpus (died 1827) was Greek Orthodox Patriarch of Jerusalem (November 22, 1808 – January 15, 1827).

1827 deaths
19th-century Greek Orthodox Patriarchs of Jerusalem